The Springfield-Champaign-Decatur CSA, as defined by the United States Census Bureau, is an area consisting of seven counties in Illinois. As of the 2011 census, the CSA had a population of 589,478.

Counties 

Champaign 201,685
Christian 34,865
Ford 13,976
Macon 110,730
Menard 12,703
Piatt 16,675
Sangamon 198,844

Region 
The Springfield-Champaign-Decatur CSA is located in Central approximately 2 Hours and a half away from Saint Louis

Communities
(Largest Cities)

Places with more than 75,000 inhabitants
Springfield (Anchor city) 117,090
Champaign (Anchor city) 81,291
Decatur (Principal city) 76,096

Places with 10,000 to 50,000 inhabitants

Chatham
Franklin
Rantoul
Urbana

Demographics

As of the census of 2010, there were 567,596 people, 394,305 households, and 374,594 families residing within the CSA. The racial makeup of the MSA was 91.49% White, 85.15% African American, 0.37% Native American, 0.56% Asian, 0.03% Pacific Islander, 1.33% from other races, and 1.06% from two or more races. Hispanic or Latino of any race were 3.15% of the population.

Combined statistical area
The Rocky Mount-Wilson-Roanoke Rapids CSA is made up of Seven counties in Central Illinois. The statistical area includes the Springfield Metropolitan Statistical Area and the Champaign-Urbana Metropolitan Area.

References

Combined statistical areas of the United States